Adam Inglis may refer to:

Adam Inglis (footballer), Australian rules footballer
Sir Adam Inglis, 3rd Baronet of the Inglis baronets